Eulimella lissa is a species of sea snail, a marine gastropod mollusk in the family Pyramidellidae, the pyrams and their allies.

Description
The white shell is small with a length of 6 mm. It has a pupiform shape. The teleoconch contains eight flattened whorls . The sculpture is smooth and polished. The suture is distinct.

Distribution
This species occurs in the following locations:
 North West Atlantic
 Cape Hatteras, North Carolina, USA

References

External links
 To Biodiversity Heritage Library (8 publications)
 To Encyclopedia of Life
 To USNM Invertebrate Zoology Mollusca Collection
 To World Register of Marine Species

lissa
Gastropods described in 1884